News Café was a public affairs program produced by 9News and Current Affairs and broadcast by 9TV (formerly Solar News Channel) from November 30, 2012 until March 12, 2015. It was hosted by Mitzi Borromeo.

Prior to 9TV switching to CNN Philippines, News Café aired "Best of News Café" on March 12, 2015 as its final episode. News Café was replaced by Profiles.

Hosts

Final
 Mitzi Borromeo (2014–2015)

Former
Amelyn Veloso (2013–2014)

See also
 List of programs broadcast by Solar News Channel

External links
 

Philippine television news shows
CNN Philippines original programming
Solar News and Current Affairs
English-language television shows
2012 Philippine television series debuts
2015 Philippine television series endings